Volleyball at the 2018 Asian Games was held in two venues in Indonesia. All matches were held at the GBK Tennis Indoor and the Bulungan Sports Hall, Jakarta.

Schedule

Medalists

Medal table

Draw
The official draw for both the men's volleyball events were held on 5 July 2018 in Jakarta.

Men
The teams were distributed according to their position at the 2014 Asian Games using the serpentine system for their distribution.

Pool A
 (Host)
 (12)

Pool B
 (1)
 (11)

Pool C
 (2)
 (10)

Pool D
 (3)
 (9)

Pool E
 (4)
 (7)

Pool F
 (5)
 (6)

Women
The teams were distributed according to their position at the 2014 Asian Games using the serpentine system for their distribution.

Pool A
 (Host)
 (3)
 (4)
 (7)

Pool B
 (1)
 (2)
 (5)
 (6)

Final standing

Men

Women

References

External links
Volleyball at the 2018 Asian Games
Beach volleyball at the 2018 Asian Games
Official Result Book – Volleyball

2018 Asian Games events
2018
Asian Games
 
2018 Asian Games